The AutoGyro eCavalon is a German electric powered autogyro that is under development by AutoGyro GmbH of Hildesheim, introduced in 2013.

The design is a development of the piston-engine powered AutoGyro Cavalon.

Design and development
The prototype was introduced in 2013 and was powered by a Bosch General Aviation Technology electric motor in Vienna. The motor was replaced by a Siemens electric motor in 2015.

The eCavalon features a single main rotor, a two-seats-in-side-by-side configuration enclosed cockpit, tricycle landing gear with wheel pants and a Siemens electric motor with a propeller mounted in pusher configuration.

The aircraft fuselage is made from composite material.

The initial endurance is 30 minutes, but battery improvements are expected to increase this to one hour, for employment in the flight training role.

Specifications (eCavalon)

See also
List of rotorcraft

References

External links

2010s German sport aircraft
Single-engined pusher autogyros
AutoGyro GmbH aircraft
Electric aircraft
Aircraft first flown in 2013